Inter Milan Youth Sector is the youth set-up of Italian professional football club Inter Milan. The under-19 team plays in the Campionato Primavera 1. They have been Italian champions ten times, Coppa Italia Primavera winners five times and have also won the Supercoppa Primavera on one occasion. They also participate in the annual Torneo di Viareggio, an international tournament which they have won six times.

On 25 March 2012, the under-19 team were champions in the inaugural edition of the NextGen Series, an association football tournament which involved the under-19 teams from 16 different clubs from across Europe.

Primavera

Current squad

Managerial history
  unknown (1962–2001)
  Corrado Verdelli (2001–2003)
  Daniele Bernazzani (2003–2006)
  Vincenzo Esposito (2006–2009)
  Fulvio Pea (2009–2011)
  Andrea Stramaccioni (2011–2012)
  Daniele Bernazzani (2012–2013)
  Salvatore Cerrone (2013–2014)
  Stefano Vecchi (2014–2018)
  Armando Madonna (2018–2021)
  Cristian Chivu (2021– )

Honours
Campionato Nazionale Primavera / Campionato Primavera 1
Champions (10): 1963–64, 1965–66, 1968–69, 1988–89, 2001–02, 2006–07, 2011–12, 2016–17, 2017–18, 2021–22
Runners-up (5): 1979–80, 2002–03, 2003–04, 2007–08, 2018–19
Coppa Italia Primavera
Champions (6): 1972–73, 1975–76, 1976–77, 1977–78, 2005–06, 2015–16
Runners-up (3): 1978–79, 2003–04, 2006–07
Supercoppa Primavera
Champions (1): 2017
Runners-up (6): 2006, 2007, 2012, 2016, 2018, 2022
Torneo di Viareggio
Champions (8): 1962, 1971, 1986, 2002, 2008, 2011, 2015, 2018
Runners-up (2): 1972, 1983
Blue Stars/FIFA Youth Cup
Champions (1): 1983
NextGen Series
Champions (1): 2011–12

Youth system
The home of Inter's Youth Sector is at Centro Sportivo Giacinto Facchetti, 30,000 square metres of professional training and education facilities between the Niguarda and Bresso districts in the north of Milan.

Inter Youth Sector has 20 scouts in the Lombardy region and 10 in the rest of Italy. They all report directly to the general coordinator in Milan.

Below the Primavera team (U19), there are nine other teams: 
Berretti (U18)
Allievi Nazionali (U17)
Allievi Nazionali Lega Pro (U16)
Giovanissimi Nazionali (U15)
Giovanissimi Regionali (U14)
Giovanissimi Regionali Fascia B (U13)
Esordienti (U12)
Pulcini Regionali (U11)
Pulcini B (U10)
Pulcini C (U9)

Honours 
Campionato Berretti: 6
1979–80, 1983–84, 1990–91, 2011–12, 2015–16, 2016–17
Campionato Allievi Nazionali: 8
1984–85, 1986–87, 1990–91, 1997–98, 2007–08, 2013–14, 2016–17, 2018–19
Campionato Giovanissimi Nazionali: 9
1987–88, 1996–97, 2002–03, 2005–06, 2008–09, 2011–12, 2012–13, 2014–15, 2017–18

References

External links
 Inter Youth Sector's official website  
 The Inter Milan  academy way – These Football Times (2015)

Primavera
Football academies in Italy
UEFA Youth League teams
NextGen series